

Preliminaries

Group A

Group B

Group C

Group D

Main tournament

Group A

Group B

Key:
Green - Winner of group; earns a spot in the challenger final.
Blue - Earns a place in the next edition's group stage.
Red - Eliminated from automatic berth; must qualify through preliminary stages.

Challenger finals

Finals

References 

Kisei (Go)
2003 in go